The Final Chapter is the third studio album by Ruff Endz.

Track listing
"Senorita"
"Love U Down"
"Ryder"
"Mr. DJ"
"She Ain`t No Good"
"Love Zone"
"Been Waiting"
"What U Need"
"Love Potion"
"My Special Home"

2010 albums
Ruff Endz albums